:ankoku butoh: is the fifth studio album by Gothic rock band Faith and the Muse. It comprises one CD and one DVD. It was the band's first release on the Danse Macabre label.

Thematically, the album reflects elements of Shinto and Japanese culture. In accordance with this, the booklet accompanying the album was printed back-to-front.

Track listing (CD) 
All tracks by Faith and the Muse

DVD track Listing
Videos
 Battle Hymn (album video) (link opens in a new page)
 Blessed (album video)
 Interview with the band

Live Concert Film
 Scars Flown Proud
 The Silver Circle
 Bait & Switch / Sredni Vashtar
 Relic Song
 Shattered in Aspect
 Paul Mercer: Solo
 The Burning Season
 The Trauma Coil
 All Lovers Lost / Arianrhod
 Fade and Remain
 Sparks
 Cantus

Rarities & Extras
 Sparks (1994 Video)
 Annwyn, Beneath the Waves (live at WGT 1998)
 The Burning Season (2004 Video)
 Into My Own (2007 Video)
 Anafae (Official Trailer)

Personnel 
All instruments and voices performed by William Faith and Monica Richards except:
Violin by Paul Mercer • Cello by Marzia Rangel
Dragon Artwork by Jim Neely
Produced by Faith and the Muse
Recorded by William Faith @ Zone 0, Los Angeles, CA
Mixed and mastered by Chad Blinman @ The Eye Socket, Los Angeles, California

References 

Faith and the Muse albums
2009 albums